The French Provisional Government may refer to:

 French Provisional Government of 1814, after the Napoleonic Wars
 French Provisional Government of 1815, after Napoleon's "Hundred Days" restoration
 French Provisional Government of 1848, after the July Monarchy
 Provisional Government of the French Republic, 1944–1946, after World War II